Turks in Qatar form one of the country's smaller minority groups. When Turkish labour migration to Germany subsided in the mid-1970s, Turkish migrants began to migrate to Arab oil countries, especially Libya, Saudi Arabia and Iraq as well as Qatar. The Turkish government supported labour migration via Turkish construction companies in the Gulf Cooperation Council states. Over 90% of Turkish immigrants in Qatar are employed.

Notable people
Nada Zeidan, first female Arab rally driver

See also
 Qatar–Turkey relations

References

Bibliography 
 
 .
 .

Qatar
Ethnic groups in Qatar
Qatari people of Turkish descent